Stadio Enzo Ricci is a multi-use stadium in Sassuolo, Italy. It holds 4,008 people. It was used as professional football club U.S. Sassuolo Calcio's home ground prior to their promotion to Serie B in 2008, when it agreed on a move to the larger Stadio Alberto Braglia in Modena. The club has continued to use the ground for training.

In 1983, the stadium was named after Enzo Ricci, a local doctor and club patron.

References

U.S. Sassuolo Calcio
Enzo Ricci